The 299th Tactical Aviation Brigade "Lieutenant General Vasyl Nikiforov" is a formation of the Ukrainian Air Force based at Kulbakino Air Base. The unit is equipped with Sukhoi Su-25 attack aircraft and is tasked with providing close air support for the Ukrainian Ground Forces and the Ukrainian Navy. It is subordinated to Air Command South headquartered at Odessa and has some 950 servicemen. Initially the airbase operated solely Su-25s but in November 2007 it inherited some 20 Aero L-39 Albatros trainer aircraft from a disbanded unit. Known operational aircraft as of 2016 are 13 L-39Cs and 23 Su-25s (of which 5 are Su-25UBs).

History
The unit was established as the 299th Instructor-Research Shipborne Aviation Regiment of Soviet Naval Aviation in September 1976. In 1990 it was renamed 299th independent Maritime Assault Aviation Regiment.

In January 1992 the regiment was renamed the 299th Independent Assault Aviation Regiment.

2014 war In Donbas

Since 2014, the brigade participated in hostilities as part of the government operation against Pro-Russian rebels in Donbas.

On 2 July 2014, a Su-25, call sign Blue 06, crashed due to a technical fault while landing at Dnipropetrovsk International Airport. The pilot ejected safely. 

On the morning of 16 July 2014, Su-25 call sign Blue 03, was shot down over eastern Ukraine near Amvrosiivka town, and the pilot ejected successfully. National Security Council spokesman Andriy Lysenko said that it was shot down by a missile fired from a Russian Mikoyan MiG-29. 

On 23 July 2014, two Su-25 strike fighters, call sign Blue 04 and Blue 33 were shot down in the rebel-held area of Savur-Mohyla. Ukrainian authorities claimed that they were hit by long-range anti-aircraft missiles launched from Russia. Ukrainian Prime Minister, Arseniy Yatsenyuk, said later in an interview that one of the attack planes was probably shot down by an air-to-air missile. 

On 29 August 2014, a pair of Su-25 after returning from a mission on Kuteynikov, were attacked by enemy fire. Blue 08, piloted by Vladislav Voloshin, was shot down near Starobeshevo by a surface-to-air missile during the battle of Ilovaisk. The pilot, Captain Vladyslav Voloshyn, ejected and after 4 days was able to reach Ukrainian-controlled territory, was secured by a unit of the Ukrainian National Guard.

Later service
The 299th TAB suffered the loss of two Su-25 strike aircraft due to accidents. The first on 11 November 2015, when strike aircraft call sign Blue 07 piloted by Lieutenant Yegor Bolshakov crashed after colliding with high voltage transmission lines, the pilot died. Another strike aircraft, Blue 38 was lost on 14 July 2016 at Starokostiantyniv air base, after a failed take off.

List of aircraft
Before the 2022 Russian invasion of Ukraine, the brigade consisted of 1 Su-25, 13 Su-25M1, 5 Su-25M1K, 3 Su-25UBM1, 2 Su-25UBM1K.

Another 12 unidentified Su-25 aircraft were reported lost.

On 26 February 2022, Pilot Andrey Maksinov was shotdown and captured by Russian forces, he was interviewed by Russian media. 

On 2 March 2022 a Su-25 piloted by Oleksandr Korpan was lost over Starokostiantyniv, Khmelnytskyi Oblast. The pilot died.

On 3 March 2022, a Su-25 piloted by Captain  was lost over Mykolayv.

On 14 March 2022, a Su-25 was shot down by Russian forces in Volnovakha, Donbas region. The pilot, Roman Vasyliuk, captured by Russian forces was later released on 24 April, by a Russo-Ukrainian prisoner swap. 

On 22 March 2022, a Su-25, heavily damaged by combat damage is recorded in video.

On 15 April 2022, Russian forces shot down a Su-25 in Izyum, the Pilot Yegor Seredyuk was reported dead. Seredyuk was awarded with the Hero of Ukraine order. 

On 14 May 2022, a Su-25 piloted by Captain Serhiy Parkhomenko was shot down in Huliaipole, Zaporizhzhia Oblast. The pilot died and was buried in Vinnytsia.

On 27 July, the head of Intelligence of the 299th Tactical Aviation Brigade, Oleksandr Kukurba died while flying a combat mission defending Ukrainian skies on his Su-25.

On 7 September 2022, Ukrainian media reported the death of 299th TAB pilot Vadim Blagovismy while flying a combat mission on a Su-25.

On 19 September 2022, the remains of a Su-25, were found in Yehorivka, Donetsk Oblast. The aircraft was destroyed by a Russian 9K33 Osa.

On 6 January 2023, a Ukrainian Su-25 aircraft,, was shot down by MANPADs near Bakhmut.

On 27 January 2023, Ukrainian media reported the death of 299th Tactical Aviation Brigade, pilot Danilo Murashko while flying a combat mission on Kramatorsk.

References

Air force brigades of Ukraine